Ancer may refer to:

Abraham Ancer (born 1991), Mexican professional golfer
Jonathan Ancer, South African journalist, author, podcaster and media trainer
Ancer L. Haggerty (born 1944), inactive Senior United States District Judge
Jesús Ancer Rodríguez Doctor of Philosophy, Mexican researcher and physician

See also
El Ancer, town and commune in Jijel Province, Algeria
El Ancer District, district in Jijel Province, Algeria